U.S. Route 183 (US 183) is a north-south U.S. highway that begins in Texas in Refugio at an intersection with US 77 (Future I-69E) concurrent with US 77 Alt. The highway runs through many small communities with Austin being the only major city along its route.  The highway exits Texas concurrent with US 70, crossing into Oklahoma.

Route description
US 183 begins concurrent with US 77 Alt at its southern terminus one block north of downtown Refugio at an intersection with US 77; the two highways subsequently travel north through mostly rural farmlands across the Gulf Coastal Plains. After serving the Presidio La Bahía, US 183 crosses the San Antonio River to serve the Goliad State Park and Historic Site and the city of Goliad, intersecting US 59 in the center of town. Traveling through additional farmlands and forests, US 183 eventually forms a concurrency with US 87 just before crossing the Guadalupe River and travels along Espalande Street through downtown Cuero, ending its concurrency of US 87 in the town center. North of Cuero, US 77 Alt splits off to the northeast, while US 183 continues parallel to the Guadalupe River's course. The highway cuts through the historic Battle of Gonzales site and borders the city of Gonzales to the west, intersecting US 90 Alt to the northwest of the city. Running parallel to the San Marcos River, US 183 provides access to Palmetto State Park before crossing I-10 and forming a concurrency with US 90 west to Luling via Pierce Street. In the center of Luling, US 183 leaves US 90 and turns onto Magnolia Avenue, traveling due north past many decorated oil wells.

Continuing through rural farmlands, US 183 eventually enters Lockhart, being the main north-south route through the city. The highway then merges onto the SH 130 frontage roads just north of Lockhart, following them until Mustang Ridge where SH 130 splits northeast to follow SH 45 and US 183 continues north into Colton and Pilot Knob. As US 183 crosses into Austin and intersects several local roads providing access to McKinney Falls State Park, it borders the west side of Austin-Bergstrom International Airport before having an interchange with SH 71 and  enters Austin's Montopolis district. US 183 crosses the Colorado River adjacent to the old Montopolis truss bridge prior to serving a major fork east of the Govalle district, making a sigmoid curve east to serve the Colony Park district. US 183 eventually becomes a  six-lane freeway north of the Windsor Park district just before crossing US 290, curving west to serve I-35 and Loop 275 (Lamar Boulevard); north of Lamar Boulevard, the US 183 frontage road is redesignated as Research Boulevard throughout the rest of its length in Austin. The highway makes another sigmoid curve to the north before an interchange with Loop 1 (Mopac Expressway).

After an interchange with Loop 360 (Capital of Texas Highway), US 183 serves much of northwest Austin. It eventually intersects SH 45 near Lakeline Mall and becomes a surface street while the freeway continues on the east side as 183A Toll Road. US 183 continues as Bell Boulevard through west Cedar Park before intersecting 183A in Leander. Continuing north, US 183 runs mostly through forests and farmland as it crosses the North and South Forks of the San Gabriel River. After turning through several hills east of the Texas Hill Country, US 183 bounds northwest into Lampasas, where it runs on Key Avenue concurrent with US 190 and US 281 through fourteen blocks in the city's downtown and recreational areas before splitting to the northwest from US 281 north of Lampasas.

US 183 and US 190 continue traveling northwest through rolling hills, eventually splitting southeast of the Lometa city limits. US 183 continues to run parallel to the Colorado River before beginning a concurrency with US 84 north of the Goldthwaite city limits. The two highways continue northwest for a long distance before reaching Early and joining US 67 and US 377 at the town's center. The four highways travel west for roughly eleven blocks before US 183 splits to the north and serves Brownwood Regional Airport. US 183 continues due north, crossing SH 36 in Rising Star and later I-20 just south of Cisco.

South of Throckmorton, US 283 joins the highway, an overlap that lasts until Vernon, where 183 joins US 70 and US 287. In Oklaunion, US 70 and 183 leave US 287 and cross the Red River together into Oklahoma.

History

Austin

Through 1990, none of US 183 through Austin was built to freeway standards. By 2002, the portion of US 183, known as Research Boulevard, had been upgraded to a freeway. At that time, Research Boulevard, between Spicewood Springs Road and Cameron Road, was built as a viaduct with grade separated limited access. The northern freeway portion between Spicewood Springs Road and Bell Boulevard in Cedar Park, was completed by 2003.

The southern freeway portion between Cameron Road and US 290, became completed in 2002.

In Cedar Park, the limited access portion of Research Boulevard would become the 183A Toll Road, as US 183 would serve as a major arterial through the city as Bell Boulevard. The toll road opened in March 2007. The roads rejoin north of Leander.

In 2015, it was announced work would start on the conversion of the then-55-year-old portion of US 183 from US 290 to SH 71 into a three-to-five-lane tollway. The traffic lights at 51st Street, Techni Center Drive, Bolm Road (formerly a diamond interchange), Vargas Road, and Thompson Lane were all removed. In addition to these changes, an interchange at Patton Avenue was constructed, the pedestrian crossing bridge just south of Manor Road was upgraded, and Montopolis Bridge was decommissioned in favor of a new truss bridge that serves as a pedestrian walkway, no longer open to motorized traffic. Construction began in early 2016 with expected completion in late 2019 or early 2020. The first section of the tollway opened on July 31, 2019, at which point the rest of the project was to be completed by late 2020.

Throughout 2018 to 2021, construction commenced to add three additional flyovers at the intersection of US 183 and I-35. When construction on the southbound I-35 to northbound US 183 flyover was completed, the preexisting northbound I-35 to northbound US 183 flyover was demolished on May 8, 2021 in favor of a replacement flyover completed on September 10, 2021, due to concerns over the latter flyover's incline being too steep for larger vehicles to navigate without delaying other traffic.

Major intersections

See also

183A Toll Road

References

External links

83-1
Transportation in Refugio County, Texas
Transportation in Goliad County, Texas
Transportation in DeWitt County, Texas
Transportation in Gonzales County, Texas
Transportation in Caldwell County, Texas
Transportation in Travis County, Texas
Transportation in Williamson County, Texas
Transportation in Burnet County, Texas
Transportation in Lampasas County, Texas
Transportation in Mills County, Texas
Transportation in Brown County, Texas
Transportation in Eastland County, Texas
Transportation in Stephens County, Texas
Transportation in Throckmorton County, Texas
Transportation in Baylor County, Texas
Transportation in Wilbarger County, Texas
 Texas